The 2002 Auburn Tigers football team represented Auburn University in the 2002 NCAA Division I-A football season.  Auburn, led by head coach Tommy Tuberville, finished with record of 9–4, including a 5–3 record in the Southeastern Conference.  Following a disappointing 7–5 finish the previous season, the coaching staff of the 2002 Tigers featured two prominent new members.  Bobby Petrino was hired as the new offensive coordinator, and Gene Chizik joined the staff as the Tigers' new defensive coordinator.  Petrino left following the season to assume the head coaching job at Louisville, while Chizik remained at Auburn through the 2004 season before leaving for the defensive coordinator position at Texas. The Tigers finished the season ranked #14 in the AP Poll and #16 in the Coaches Poll.

Schedule

Roster

Captains

References

Auburn
Auburn Tigers football seasons
Citrus Bowl champion seasons
Auburn Tigers football